In measure theory, an area of mathematics, Egorov's theorem establishes a condition for the uniform convergence of a pointwise convergent sequence of measurable functions. It is also named Severini–Egoroff theorem or Severini–Egorov theorem, after Carlo Severini, an Italian mathematician, and Dmitri Egorov, a Russian physicist and geometer, who published independent proofs respectively in 1910 and 1911.

Egorov's theorem can be used along with compactly supported continuous functions to prove Lusin's theorem for integrable functions.

Historical note
The first proof of the theorem was given by Carlo Severini in 1910: he used the result as a tool in his research on series of orthogonal functions. His work remained apparently unnoticed outside Italy, probably due to the fact that it is written in Italian, appeared in a scientific journal with limited diffusion and was considered only as a means to obtain other theorems. A year later Dmitri Egorov published his independently proved results, and the theorem became widely known under his name: however, it is not uncommon to find references to this theorem as the Severini–Egoroff theorem. Further generalizations were given much later by Pavel Korovkin, in the paper , and by Gabriel Mokobodzki in the paper .

Formal statement and proof

Statement
Let (fn) be a sequence of M-valued measurable functions, where M is a separable metric space, on some measure space (X,Σ,μ), and suppose there is a measurable subset A ⊆ X, with finite μ-measure, such that (fn) converges μ-almost everywhere on A to a limit function f. The following result holds: for every ε > 0, there exists a measurable subset B of A such that μ(B) < ε, and (fn) converges to f uniformly on A \ B.

Here, μ(B) denotes the μ-measure of B. In words, the theorem says that pointwise convergence almost everywhere on A implies the apparently much stronger uniform convergence everywhere except on some subset B of arbitrarily small measure. This type of convergence is also called almost uniform convergence.

Discussion of assumptions and a counterexample
 The hypothesis μ(A) < ∞ is necessary. To see this, it is simple to construct a counterexample when μ is the Lebesgue measure: consider the sequence of real-valued indicator functions  defined on the real line.
 The separability of the metric space is needed to make sure that for M-valued, measurable functions f and g, the distance d(f(x), g(x)) is again a measurable real-valued function of x.

Proof
Fix .
For natural numbers n and k, define the set En,k by the union

These sets get smaller as n increases, meaning that En+1,k is always a subset of En,k, because the first union involves fewer sets. A point x, for which the sequence (fm(x)) converges to f(x), cannot be in every En,k for a fixed k, because fm(x) has to stay closer to f(x) than 1/k eventually. Hence by the assumption of μ-almost everywhere pointwise convergence on A,

for every k. Since A is of finite measure, we have continuity from above; hence there exists, for each k, some natural number nk such that

For x in this set we consider the speed of approach into the 1/k-neighbourhood of f(x) as too slow. Define

as the set of all those points x in A, for which the speed of approach into at least one of these 1/k-neighbourhoods of f(x) is too slow. On the set difference  we therefore have uniform convergence.

Appealing to the sigma additivity of μ and using the geometric series, we get

Generalizations

Luzin's version

Statement
Under the same hypothesis of the abstract Severini–Egorov theorem suppose that A is the union of a sequence of measurable sets of finite μ-measure, and (fn) is a given sequence of M-valued measurable functions on some measure space (X,Σ,μ), such that (fn) converges μ-almost everywhere on A to a limit function f, then A can be expressed as the union of a sequence of measurable sets H, A1, A2,... such that μ(H) = 0 and (fn) converges to f uniformly on each set Ak.

Proof
It is sufficient to consider the case in which the set A is itself of finite μ-measure: using this hypothesis and the standard Severini–Egorov theorem, it is possible to define by mathematical induction a sequence of sets {Ak}k=1,2,... such that

and such that (fn) converges to f uniformly on each set Ak for each k. Choosing

then obviously μ(H) = 0 and the theorem is proved.

Korovkin's version

Statement
Let (M,d) denote a separable metric space and (X,Σ) a measurable space: consider a measurable set A and a class  containing A and its measurable subsets such that their countable in unions and intersections belong to the same class. Suppose there exists a non-negative measure μ such that μ(A) exists and

Proof
Consider the indexed family of sets whose index set is the set of natural numbers  defined as follows:

Obviously

and

therefore there is a natural number m0 such that putting A0,m0=A0 the following relation holds true:

Using A0 it is possible to define the following indexed family

satisfying the following two relationships, analogous to the previously found ones, i.e.

and

This fact enable us to define the set A1,m1=A1, where m1 is a surely existing natural number such that

By iterating the shown construction, another indexed family of set {An} is defined such that it has the following properties:

 
  for all 
 for each  there exists km such that for all  then  for all 

and finally putting

the thesis is easily proved.

Notes

References

Historical references
, available at Gallica.
.
.
. Published by the Accademia Gioenia in Catania.
.
, available from the Biblioteca Digitale Italiana di Matematica. The obituary of Carlo Severini.
. A short note in which Leonida Tonelli credits Severini for the first proof of Severini–Egorov theorem.

Scientific references 
 
. A definitive monograph on integration and measure theory: the treatment of the limiting behavior of the integral of various kind of sequences of measure-related structures (measurable functions, measurable sets, measures and their combinations) is somewhat conclusive.
.

 (available at the Polish Virtual Library of Science).

External links

Theorems in measure theory
Articles containing proofs